The Zee Cine Award Best Costume Design is a technical award.

The winners are listed below:-

See also 

 Zee Cine Awards
 Bollywood
 Cinema of India

References

External links
Winners of the 2007 Zee Cine Awards

Zee Cine Awards
Awards for film costume design